Billiluna, also known as Mindibungu and Kururrungku, is a medium-sized Aboriginal community, located approximately  south of Halls Creek in the Kimberley region of Western Australia, within the Shire of Halls Creek.

History 
Billiluna was established as a permanent Aboriginal community around 1978 when Aboriginal people moved from the Balgo Mission to the Billiluna Station after the cattle station's pastoral lease had been transferred from a private company to the Aboriginal Lands Trust. It was incorporated as an Aboriginal corporation in 1979, and construction of houses and schools began in that year.

Description and governance
The community is managed through its incorporated body, Mindibungu Aboriginal Corporation, incorporated under the Aboriginal Councils and Associations Act 1976 on 12 December 1979. The corporation has run the Kurruungku Store since 1996.

Demographics

Native title 

The community is located within the determination area of the Tjurabalan people (WAD160/1997) native title claim.

Education 
Children of school age at Billiluna attend the Kururrungku Catholic Education Centre. The school caters for approximately 80 enrolled students between pre-primary to year 10 with 7 registered teachers and a principal.

Town planning 
Billiluna Layout Plan No.1 has been prepared in accordance with State Planning Policy 3.2 Aboriginal Settlements. Layout Plan No.1 was endorsed by the community on 22 September 2011, and by the Western Australian Planning Commission on 24 July 2012. A third amendment was made in September 2020.

References

Towns in Western Australia
Aboriginal communities in Kimberley (Western Australia)